Frohn Township is a township in Beltrami County, Minnesota, United States. The population was 1,433 as of the 2010 census. Frohn Township was named after Fron, in Norway, the homeland of a large share of the early settlers.

Geography

Major highway
  U.S. Route 2

Lakes
 Goose Lake
 Grace Lake
 Lake Swenson
 School Lake
 Stocking Lake
 Stump Lake (southeast three-quarters)
 Wolf Lake

Adjacent townships
 Turtle River Township (north)
 Sugar Bush Township (northeast)
 Ten Lake Township (east)
 Pike Bay Township, Cass County (southeast)
 Farden Township, Hubbard County (south)
 Helga Township, Hubbard County (southwest)
 Bemidji Township (west)

Cemeteries
The township contains East Side Cemetery.

Demographics
As of the census of 2000, there were 1,408 people, 497 households, and 396 families residing in the township. There were 631 housing units at an average density of 19.4/sq mi (7.5/km2). The racial makeup of the township was 87.22% White, 9.09% Native American, 0.21% Asian, 0.07% Pacific Islander, 0.85% from other races, and 2.56% from two or more races. Hispanic or Latino of any race were 1.07% of the population.

There were 497 households, out of which 39.8% had children under the age of 18 living with them, 68.6% were married couples living together, 6.6% had a female householder with no husband present, and 20.3% were non-families. 16.1% of all households were made up of individuals, and 5.8% had someone living alone who was 65 years of age or older.  The average household size was 2.83 and the average family size was 3.16.

In the township the population was spread out, with 29.2% under the age of 18, 7.7% from 18 to 24, 28.8% from 25 to 44, 27.1% from 45 to 64, and 7.2% who were 65 years of age or older.  The median age was 36 years. For every 100 females, there were 106.1 males.  For every 100 females age 18 and over, there were 110.3 males.

The median income for a household in the township was $47,788, and the median income for a family was $53,250. Males had a median income of $35,263 versus $25,735 for females. The per capita income for the township was $17,988.  About 3.6% of families and 7.4% of the population were below the poverty line, including 7.1% of those under age 18 and 4.4% of those age 65 or over.

References
 United States National Atlas
 United States Census Bureau 2007 TIGER/Line Shapefiles
 United States Board on Geographic Names (GNIS)

External links
Frohn Township official website

Townships in Beltrami County, Minnesota
Townships in Minnesota